Gavião Kyikatejê Futebol Clube, commonly known as Gavião Kyikatejê, is a Brazilian football club based in Bom Jesus do Tocantins, Pará state. They are the first professional indigenous football club in Brazil.

History
Gavião Kyikatejê was founded on January 1, 2009 in Bom Jesus do Tocantins, becoming the first professional indigenous football club in Brazil. The club competes in the Campeonato Paraense Second Level.

Stadium
Gavião Kyikatejê Futebol Clube play their home games at Estádio Municipal Zinho de Oliveira, located in Marabá, Pará state. The stadium has a maximum capacity of 4,000 people.

References

Football clubs in Pará
Association football clubs established in 2009
Indigenous culture in Brazil
2009 establishments in Brazil